Meow is an imitative word for a sound made in cat communication. 

Meow or Miaow may also refer to:

Film and television
 Meow (2017 film), a 2017 Hong Kong science fantasy comedy film
 Meow (2021 film), a 2021 Indian Malayalam-language family drama film
 Meow (Dark Angel), an episode in the TV series Dark Angel
 Meow, a cat-like alien character in the anime Space Dandy
 Meeow!, a 2000-2003 British animated series, called Meusaidh in Gaelic

Music 
 Miaow (band), an English band
 Miaow (album), a 1994 album by The Beautiful South
 Mew (band), a band from Denmark
 "Meow", a song from the Anamanaguchi album Endless Fantasy
 "Meow Meow" (song), a song from the Tamil film Kanthaswamy
 "Me-ow", a 1918 ragtime song by Mel B. Kaufman

Other uses 
 Meow 104.8 FM, an FM Radio Channel in India
 Meow (cat), once the world's heaviest cat
 Miaow, or miaow miaow, a supposed slang name for the stimulant drug mephedrone
 Meow (Pillow Pal), a cat Pillow Pal plush toy made by Ty
 MEOW, a sarcastic initialism for the phrase Moral Equivalent of War

See also 
 Colonel Meow, an individual cat with this name noted for its fur length
 Meow Wars, a series of flame wars on Usenet in the 1990s
 Meow Meow (disambiguation)
 Meowy (disambiguation)
 Miao (disambiguation)
 Miou Miou, a Czech pop band
 Miou-Miou, French actress
 Cat's meow (disambiguation)